Peter Balette (born 11 April 1961) is a Belgian football coach. He is currently technical director at K.A.A. Gent.

Coaching career
As of 9 June 2007, he was working at Club Brugge, first as the assistant to Jacky Mathijssen, and later on as the assistant to Matthijssens' successor, Adrie Koster.
In June 2011, the contract between Club Bruges and Balette was broken by mutual agreement. He became the assistant coach at Standard Liège from June 2011, under José Riga, and, starting on 29 May 2012, under Ron Jans. After Jans' dismissal on 23 October 2012, he was the interim head coach, and on 27 October 2012, he became the assistant to Mircea Rednic. Before the start of the 2013–14 season, he was fired along with Rednic. When Rednic signed at KAA Gent on 1 October 2013, he took Balette as his assistant. On 9 April 2014, Balette became the head coach, assisted by Bernd Thijs, after Rednic was sent away due to disappointing results. In the 2015–2016 season, he was the assistant coach at K.R.C. Genk, with head coach Peter Maes. After one season at Genk, he returned to K.A.A. Gent.

References

1961 births
Living people
Association football midfielders
Belgian footballers
Standard Liège managers
K.A.A. Gent managers
Belgian football managers
Club Brugge KV non-playing staff
Standard Liège non-playing staff
Lommel S.K. managers
K. Beringen F.C. managers